Physaria didymocarpa is a species of flowering plant in the mustard family known by the common name common twinpod. It is native to western North America, including British Columbia and Alberta in Canada and the northwestern United States.

This perennial herb produces several decumbent stems from a hairy caudex. The ends of the stems have inflorescences which are dense racemes of yellow flowers. The petals are roughly one centimeter long.

There are three subspecies of this plant. The ssp. lanata is native to Montana and Wyoming. The ssp. lyrata, a taxon characterized by its very inflated, papery fruits, is endemic to Idaho.

References

External links
USDA Plants Profile
The Nature Conservancy

didymocarpa
Flora of the Western United States
Flora of Western Canada
Least concern flora of the United States
Taxa named by Asa Gray